Gabriela Cabezón Cámara (born 1968) is an Argentine writer. She was born in San Isidro, Buenos Aires, and studied at the University of Buenos Aires. She is best known for her debut novel La Virgen Cabeza which was translated into English by Frances Riddle as Slum Virgin. She has also published a graphic novel Beya in collaboration with Iñaki Echeverría.

She was writer-in-residence at UC Berkeley in 2013. She is a co-founder of the feminist movement NiUnaMenos (“Not One Less”).

Her novel The Adventures of China Iron was shortlisted for the 2020 International Booker Prize.

Selected works
 2009: La Virgen Cabeza (Slum Virgin)
 2011: Le viste la cara a Dios
 2014: Romance de la negra rubia
 2017: The Adventures of China Iron

References

1968 births
Argentine women novelists
Living people
Lesbian novelists
Argentine feminists
Feminist writers
Argentine LGBT novelists
Writers from Buenos Aires
21st-century Argentine novelists
21st-century Argentine women writers